Loïc Schwartz (born 4 December 1992) is a Belgian professional basketball player for Saint-Quentin of the LNB Pro B. He also represents the Belgium national basketball team internationally.

Professional career
Schwartz started his career with Belfius Mons-Hainaut in 2010, where he stayed three seasons. He then went on to play one season with Verviers-Pepinster and three seasons with Spirou Charleroi.

In 2017, Schwartz signed with the defending champions BC Oostende. In the 2020 offseason, Schwartz extended his contract with Oostende until 2023. In the 2020–21 season, Schwartz had a breakout season in which he averaged 11.4 points per game. In March, he won his third Belgian Cup title and was named the Cup Final MVP, after he added 11 points in the final. His season earned him the Belgian Player of the Year. Later, he won his fourth Belgian championship with Oostende and was named the PBL Finals MVP. In the finals series against Mons-Hainaut, he averaged 11.5 points, 4.5 rebounds and 3 assists per game.

On August 2, 2021, Schwartz signed with Greek club Promitheas Patras.

On January 28, 2022, he has signed with Orléans Loiret Basket of the LNB Pro A.

National team career
Since 2014, Schwartz represents the Belgium national basketball team. Before, he also played the Under-16, Under-18 and Under-20 national teams.

References

1992 births
Living people
BC Oostende players
Belfius Mons-Hainaut players
Belgian men's basketball players
Orléans Loiret Basket players
RBC Pepinster players
Shooting guards
Spirou Charleroi players
Sportspeople from Brussels